Scally (also spelled Skelly or Skally) and "Ni Sceallaígh” in Irish and “Ni Scalaí” in modern Irish is a surname of Irish origin.

Origins
The surname Scally is an anglicized version of the Gaelic "Mac Scalaíghe ", which means "Son of the Storyteller". It was first found in County Westmeath. The variations of the name were formed when church officials spelled the names as they were pronounced, which caused many different spellings of the surname.

Variations
The first recorded spelling of the family name is shown to be that of Mac Scalaíghe, which was dated around 1100 by the Ancient Records of Westmeath during the reign of High Kings of Ireland.

The clan were forced to spread out due to Anglo-Norman pressure but many remained in the Midlands.

The form Scales is found mainly in County Clare

The form Skelly is found mainly in Counties Roscommon and Westmeath.

Scally also found in County Antrim and Down.

Notable people surnamed Scally

Academia
 Gabriel Scally (born 1954), Irish public health physician

Arts and entertainment
 Alex Scally (born 1982), American musician
 Caroline Scally (1886–1973), Irish artist
 Gwyneth Scally, American artist

Sport
 Cathal Scally, (born 1994), Irish hurler
 Ciaran Scally, Irish rugby player in the 1990s
 Gabriel Scally (born 1947), Argentine field hockey player
 Joseph Scally (born 2002), American soccer player 
 Luis Scally (1915–1994), Argentine field hockey player 
 Neil Scally (born 1978), Scottish footballer
 Paul Scally, businessman, chairman of Gillingham Football Club in Kent, England 
 Tommy Scally (1927–1977), Argentine field hockey player
 Nathan Scally (born 1995), once ran a 5k in 21 minutes

References

External links
 History of the surname Scally

Surnames
Surnames of Irish origin